A shipyard, also called a dockyard or boatyard, is a place where ships are built and repaired. These can be yachts, military vessels, cruise liners or other cargo or passenger ships. Dockyards are sometimes more associated with maintenance and basing activities than shipyards, which are sometimes associated more with initial construction. The terms are routinely used interchangeably, in part because the evolution of dockyards and shipyards has often caused them to change or merge roles.

Countries with large shipbuilding industries include Australia, Brazil, China, Croatia, Denmark, Finland, France, Germany, India, Ireland, Italy, Japan, the Netherlands, Norway, the Philippines, Poland, Romania, Russia, Singapore, South Korea, Sweden, Taiwan, Turkey, the United Arab Emirates, Ukraine, the United Kingdom, the United States and Vietnam. The shipbuilding industry is more fragmented in Europe than in Asia where countries tend to have fewer, larger companies. Many naval vessels are built or maintained in shipyards owned or operated by the national government or navy.

Shipyards are constructed near the sea or tidal rivers to allow easy access for their ships. The United Kingdom, for example, has shipyards on many of its rivers.

The site of a large shipyard will contain many specialised cranes, dry docks, slipways, dust-free warehouses, painting facilities and extremely large areas for fabrication of the ships. After a ship's useful life is over, it makes its final voyage to a shipbreaking yard, often on a beach in South Asia. Historically shipbreaking was carried on in drydock in developed countries, but high wages and environmental regulations have resulted in movement of the industry to developing regions.

History

The world's earliest known dockyards were built in the Harappan port city of Lothal circa 2400 BC in Gujarat, India.
Lothal's dockyards connected to an ancient course of the Sabarmati river on the trade route between Harappan cities in Sindh and the peninsula of Saurashtra when the present-day surrounding Kutch desert formed a part of the Arabian Sea.

Lothal engineers accorded high priority to the creation of a dockyard and a warehouse to serve the purposes of naval trade. The dock was built on the eastern flank of the town, and is regarded by archaeologists as an engineering feat of the highest order. It was located away from the main current of the river to avoid silting, but provided access to ships at high tide as well.

The name of the ancient Greek city on the Gulf of Corinth, Naupactus, means "shipyard" (combination of the Greek words ναύς naus: "ship, boat"; and πήγνυμι pêgnumi, pegnymi: "builder, fixer"). Naupactus' reputation in this field extends to the time of legend, in which it is depicted as the place where the Heraclidae built a fleet to invade the Peloponnesus.

In the Spanish city of Barcelona, the  Drassanes shipyards were active from at least the mid-13th century until the 18th century, although at times they served as a barracks for troops as well as an arsenal. During their time of operation the Drassanes were continuously changed, rebuilt and modified, but two original towers and part of the original eight construction-naves remain today. The site is currently a maritime museum.

From the 14th century, several hundred years before the Industrial Revolution, ships were the first items to be manufactured in a factory - in the Venice Arsenal of the Venetian Republic in present-day Italy. The Arsenal apparently  mass-produced nearly one ship every day using  pre-manufactured parts and assembly lines. At its height in the 16th century the enterprise employed 16,000 people.

Spain built component ships of the Great Armada of 1588 at ports such as Algeciras or Málaga.

Historic shipyards 
 Lothal in Gujarat, India circa 2400 BC to 1900 BC
 Naupactus
 Tel Abu Saifi, Northern Sinai, a 4th century BCE, Ptolemaic Era, Egyptian dockyard, with two dry docks.
 Roman shipyard of Stifone (Narni)
 Blackwall Yard 1614 to 1987
 Scotts Shipbuilding and Engineering Company, Greenock, Scotland, 1711–1984
 Kraljevica Shipyard established on 28 April 1729 and still operating yard 
 Thames Ironworks and Shipbuilding Co. Ltd 1837 to 1912
 William Denny and Brothers, Dumbarton, Scotland 1840 to 1963
 John Brown & Company, Clydebank, Scotland 1851 to 1972
 Gdańsk Shipyard the birthplace of Solidarity Movement – (still a working yard)
 Swan Hunter – (closed in April 2006 and sold to Bharati Shipyards, India's second largest private sector shipbuilder)
 Harland and Wolff – (still a working yard)
 Cammell Laird – (still a working repair yard)
 Blohm + Voss, where Bismarck was constructed (still a major yard)
 Havana, long the only dockyard in the Caribbean during the colonial period, the Santísima Trinidad, largest warship of its time, was built there in 1769.
 Royal Naval Dockyards in the UK (including Woolwich, Deptford, Chatham, Portsmouth and Devonport), Gibraltar, Bombay, Bermuda, Hong Kong and elsewhere worldwide
 Charlestown Navy Yard, later Boston Navy Yard, Boston, Massachusetts 1800 to 1974
 Ulstein Verft, Norway, established in 1917 (still a working yard under the Ulstein Group)
 Navy Island, Ontario, Canada – French in the 18th century, then British 1763 to War of 1812
 Mare Island Naval Shipyard, Mare Island, California, 1854 to 1996
 New York Naval Shipyard (NYNSY), also known as the Brooklyn Navy Yard, the New York Navy Yard, and United States Navy Yard, New York 1801 to 1966
 Philadelphia Naval Shipyard 1799 to 1995, at two locations
 San Francisco Naval Shipyard, later Hunters Point Naval Shipyard, then Treasure Island Naval Station Hunters Point Annex, 1941 to 1994
 Colonna's Shipyard  1875 to present- just 10 years after the War Between the States ended.
 Long Beach Naval Shipyard, 1943 to 1997
 Portsmouth Naval Shipyard, located on Maine-New Hampshire border; Operational: 1800 to present, making it the oldest continuously-operating shipyard of the US Navy.
 Chantiers de l'Atlantique (STX France) – established in 1861 (still a working yard)
 Nantes-Indret, France – Establish in 1771 it built ships for the American Revolution including the Deane.
 3. Maj – One of the largest shipyard in Mediterranean, established in 1892 in Rijeka (still a working yard)
 SLKB Komarno (Komárno) – Slovak Shipyard Komárno – European shipyard on Danube, established in 1898
 Jean Street Shipyard 1843–present – The oldest continually operated shipyard in the U.S. Located on the Hillsborough River in Tampa, Florida.
 Gloucester Marine Railways 1859–present – Oldest working shipyard in New England. Located on Rocky Neck in Gloucester, Massachusetts.

Prominent dockyards and shipyards

Africa
 Alexandria shipyard, the oldest shipyard in Africa founded in 1831 located in Alexandria, Egypt.
 African Marine General Engineering & Company ltd, oldest & Biggest Dry dock in East Africa (Mombasa, Kenya) Founded in 1930.

North America

 Davie Shipbuilding, (formerly Chantier Davie Canada Inc) in Lévis, Québec, is the oldest continually operating shipbuilder in North America. 
 Newport News Shipbuilding, (formerly Northrop Grumman Newport News) is the largest private ship builder in the US and the one best known for its unique capacity to build the s.
 Ingalls Shipbuilding, part of Huntington Ingalls Industries, located in Pascagoula, Mississippi, repaired the USS Cole and builds offshore drilling rigs, cruise ships and naval vessels.
 National Steel and Shipbuilding Company (NASSCO) shipyard in San Diego, California,  part of General Dynamics; is the primary shipbuilding location on the west coast of the United States.
 Norfolk Naval Shipyard in Portsmouth, Virginia, is one of the largest shipyards in the world; specializing in repairing, overhauling and modernizing naval ships and submarines. It's the oldest and largest industrial facility that belongs to the United States Navy
 Electric Boat Division (EBDiv) of General Dynamics in Groton, Connecticut, with an accessory facility in Quonset Point, Rhode Island, builder of many Naval submarines over the past 100 years, with some types built only here.
 Bath Iron Works (BIW), subsidiary of General Dynamics, is a major American shipyard located on the Kennebec River in Bath, Maine.
 Puget Sound Naval Shipyard in Bremerton, Washington, is also owned by the U.S. Navy. It services ships and submarines from the West Coast.
 The Portland, Oregon, shipyard, operated by Cascade General Ship Repair (which is owned by Vigor Industrial) is the largest such facility on the United States West Coast.
 Pearl Harbor Naval Shipyard and Intermediate Maintenance Facility is operated by the US Navy. It services surface ships and submarines from the Pacific region.
 The Louisiana Port is along the Mississippi River. It involves the Bollinger company in St. Rose.
 Talleres Navales del Golfo (TNG) at the Port of Veracruz, Mexico. Member of the Hutchison Port Holdings Group
 Swiftships LLC, has three (3) shipyards in North America, in Louisiana,  co-production shipyard in Egypt and Saudi Arabia

South America

 The DIANCA shipyard in Puerto Cabello, Venezuela.
 SCRA (Construction Refurbishment and Armament Service) with two dry docks, ready for naval and general vessel works.
 Punta de Lobos (Wolves Point) in west Montevideo, established in 1874.
 Punta Maua (Maua Point) in east Montevideo, established in 1872.
 Tsakos Industrias Navales S.A.
 Cotecmar shipyard in Cartagena, Colombia.
 Enseada Industria Naval S.A., Bahia and Rio de Janeiro, Brazil
 The SIMA shipyard in Callao, Peru.
 ASMAR shipyards in Valparaiso, Talcahuano and Punta Arenas, Chile.

Europe
 Imperial Arsenal is in Istanbul, Turkey. Founded in 1454, it is still operated today under the name Haliç Shipyard.
 Riga Shipyard is in Riga, Latvia. Established in 1913 and revived after both world wars, it remains one of the largest shipyards in the Baltic region.
 Ferguson Shipbuilders is in Port Glasgow in inverclyde Scotland on the River Clyde. The Ferguson yard has been building ships for over a 110 years 

 BAE Systems Surface Ships operates three shipbuilding yards in the United Kingdom; Portsmouth, England and Scotstoun and Govan on the River Clyde in Glasgow, Scotland. Major projects include the Type 45 destroyer and the s.
 BAE Systems Submarine Solutions operates a major shipyard at Barrow-in-Furness in Cumbria, England. It is one of the few yards in the world capable of building nuclear submarines such as the Royal Navy's . Preceding companies such as Vickers Shipbuilding and Engineering have constructed hundreds of surface ships and civilian vessels in Barrow since the late 19th century.
 Fincantieri – Cantieri Navali Italiani S.p.A. is an Italian shipbuilding company based in Trieste, Italy. It was formed in 1959 and is the largest shipbuilder in Europe, and one of the largest in the world. The company has built both commercial and military vessels during its history.
 Lürssen (or Lürssen Werft) is a German shipbuilding company based in Bremen-Vegesack. Lürssen designs and constructs yachts, naval ships and special vessels. Trading as Lürssen Yachts, it is one of the leading builders of custom superyachts.
 Chantiers de l'Atlantique in Saint-Nazaire
 Fayard - also known as Lindøværftet.
 Helsinki Shipyard
 Meyer Turku
 Rauma Marine Constructions
 Russian shipyards in Vyborg, Kronstadt NovoAdmirality, Admiralty, Baltic Verf, Severnaja Verf, Sevmash, Kaliningrad Baltic Verf, Murmansk areas, Zvezda and Vostok Raffles near Vladivostok along Dalzavod, Azovskaja SudoVerf and Zaliv, More, Sevastopol SMZ are some of the main shipyards included the largest ones.
 Kiel HDW 
 Amsterdam Shipyards

 Hamburg Shipyards
 Emden Shipyard
 The Meyer Werft GmbH is one of the major German shipyards, headquartered in Papenburg at the river Ems. Founded in 1795 and starting with small wooden vessels, today Meyer Werft is one of world's leading builders of luxury passenger ships. Altogether about 700 ships of different types have been built at the yard.
 Navantia: major public Spanish shipbuilding firm, which offers its services to both military and civil sector in three industrial areas: Cartagena / Cádiz / Ferrol (headquarters: Madrid) and with recent important projects as  program and  submarine program
 Construcciones Navales del Norte LaNaval, Sestao (Bilbao)
 Cernaval
 Lisnave: repair facilities in Setúbal (Lisbon, Portugal)

Devonport Dockyard, located in the city of Plymouth, England in the county of Devon is the largest naval base in Western Europe. It has 15 dry docks,  of waterfront, 25 tidal berths, five basins and covers 650 acres (2.6 km2). It is the main refitting base for Royal Navy nuclear submarines and also handles work on frigates. It is the base for seven of the Trafalgar-class nuclear-powered hunter-killer submarines and many frigates, exploiting its convenient access to the Atlantic Ocean. It supports the Vanguard-class Trident missile nuclear ballistic missile submarines in a custom-built refitting dock. It houses , a nuclear-powered submarine used in the Falklands War and open to the general public.  Facilities in the local area also include a major naval training establishment and a base for the Royal Marines.
 Chatham Dockyard, located on the River Medway in Kent, was established as a royal dockyard by Queen Elizabeth I in 1567. For 414 years, the Dockyard provided over 500 ships for the Royal Navy, and was forefront of shipbuilding, industrial and architectural technology. At its height, it employed over 10,000 skilled artisans and covered 400 acres (1.6 km2). The dockyard closed in 1984, and most of the Georgian dockyard is now managed as a visitor attraction by the Chatham Historic Dockyard Trust.
 Damen Shiprepair in Brest, France.
 Sunderland, County Durham a town once hailed as the "Largest Shipbuilding Town in the World". ships were built on the at Sunderland Docks from at least 1346 and by the mid-18th century Sunderland was one of the chief shipbuilding towns in the country.
 Constanţa Shipyard in Romania on the shores of the Black Sea Basin.
 Galați shipyard Galați is the largest naval shipyard on the Danube, given its strategic positioning inland but with access to the sea through either Sulina or Danube-Black Sea canal its output ranges from large tankers to research vessels, yachts and small coast guard patrol boats. The yard is known for taking on specialty projects and under Damen has completed over such 250 vessels since 1999.

East Asia
 Kawasaki Shipbuilding Corporation's Kobe Shipyard & Machinery Works in Japan builds oil tankers, LNG carriers, bulk carriers, container ships, Ro/Ro vessels, jetfoils and warships for the Japan Maritime Self-Defense Force
 Mitsui Engineering & Shipbuilding's Tamano Works builds bulk carriers, ore carriers, crude oil tankers, oil product carriers, LNG carriers, LPG carriers, reefers, container ships, pure car carriers, cargo ships, patrol vessels, ocean surveillance ships, training vessels, fishery patrol boats and fishing boats
 Mitsubishi Heavy Industries's Nagasaki Shipyard & Machinery Works primarily produces specialized commercial vessels, including LNG carriers, oil tankers and passenger cruise ships
 Hyundai Heavy Industries Ulsan Shipyard & Gunsan shipyard, in South Korea, is currently the largest in the world and has the capability to build a variety of vessels including Commercial Cargo, FPSO offshore, container ship, LNG Carrier, Car carriers, Tankers like VLCC & ULCC, Iron ore carrier and Naval vessels like Aegis destroyers & submarines.
 Hyundai Samho Heavy Industries Samho shipyard near Mokpo 4th largest South Korean shipyard for VLCC Oil tankers, container ships & LNG, Offshore, Subsidiary of Hyundai heavy industries.
 Hyundai Mipo dockyard, Ulsan bay shipyard chemical ships, LPG carriers, Special ships. Subsidiary of Hyundai Heavy Industries
 CSBC Corporation, Taiwan, in Taiwan, is a private company that produces ships for civilian and military use. It was a state-owned enterprise of Taiwan (Republic of China) but transitioned to private ownership via an IPO in 2008. It is headquartered in Kaohsiung and shipyards in Kaohsiung and Keelung. 
 Yantai Raffles Shipyard, in Yantai, China, is that country's largest offshore builder. It employs the 20,000 ton crane Taisun, the holder of the Heavy Lift World Record. Yantai Raffles' portfolio includes offshore platforms, pipe lay and other specialized vessels.
 Jiangnan Shipyard, in Shanghai, China, is a subsidiary of China State Shipbuilding Corporation that produces both military and civilian ships. Its headquarters and main shipyard are based in Shanghai, with subsidiary shipyards in Shanghai and Chongqing.
 Bohai Shipyard, in Huludao, China, is a subsidiary of China Shipbuilding Industry Corporation that produces military (including nuclear powered vessels) and civilian ships.

South East Asia

 Keppel Shipyard (Singapore)
Kinabalu North Shipyard & Maritime (Sabah, Malaysia)
 ST Engineering Marine (Singapore)
Jurong Shipyard Pte Ltd (Singapore)
 Penguin Shipyard International, a subsidiary of Penguin International Limited (Singapore) 
 Hanjin shipyard in Subic, Zambales, Philippines
 Selat Melaka Shipbuilding Corporation (Malaysia)
 PT Surya Prima Bahtera Heavy Industries, in Batam, Indonesia.
 The Bangkok Dock Company Sattahip, Thailand
 Marsun Company Limited (MCL) Samutprakarn, Thailand
 Marine Acme Thai Dockyard (MAT) Samutprakarn, Thailand
 Bason Shipyard, in Ho Chi Minh City, Vietnam, is a long-standing builder that was established by the French government in April, 1863 to repair warships and merchant vessels. Aside from its main function of building and repairing naval vessels, Bason also offers service to local and foreign customers from Southeast Asia and Europe.
 PT. Dok Duasatu Nusantara in Jakarta, Indonesia.
 PT Kim Seah Shipyard Indonesia in Batam, Indonesia, a subsidiary of Penguin International Limited.
 PT Karyasindo Samudra Biru Shipyard in Batam, Indonesia, a well-established steel and aluminium shipbuilder in the region.

South Asia and the Middle East

 Haque Dockyard, situated in the capital Dhaka, one of the oldest and trusted name in shipbuilding sector of Bangladesh.
 FMC Dockyard is one of the largest shipyard of Bangladesh, located in Eastern Bank of the Karnaphuli river in Chittagong. The dockyard has its own forward and backward linkage.
 Syncrolift and side transfer system.
 Western Marine Shipyard, a leading shipyard in Bangladesh based in Chittagong. The shipyard has been exporting ships and vessels to a number of European, Asian and African countries.
 Khulna Shipyard is the oldest shipyard in Bangladesh, situated in Khulna. It mainly produces warships for Bangladesh Navy. Recently it also started to build commercial vessels like cargo ship, container, oil tanker for local buyers. 
 Ananda Shipyard and Shipways, one of the largest shipyards in Bangladesh, located in Narayanganj. It is a 100% export oriented shipyard. 
 Pipavav Shipyard in Gujarat, India, is the leading, modern and largest engineering facility in the business of ships and offshore platforms construction, repair and conversion, heavy engineering and offshore engineering in South Asia.
 Colombo Dockyard in Colombo, Sri Lanka, is the largest engineering facility in the business of ship repair, shipbuilding, heavy engineering and offshore engineering in Sri Lanka.
 NorthStar Shipbuilding Pvt Limited in New Mumbai, India, is one of the leading shipyard in India for small and mid-size ships.
 Sulkha Shipyard  builds a wide variety of ships. It has been in operation for 500 years.
 Cochin Shipyard in Kochi, India, is that country's largest shipyard.
 Garden Reach Shipbuilders and Engineers is located in India. It is owned by the Government of India and is constructing the s for the Indian Navy.
 Karachi Shipyard and Naval Dockyard in Karachi, Pakistan, is that country's first and oldest yard. It constructs cargo ships, tugboats, support vessels, and warships.
 Mazagaon Dockyard, operated by state-owned Mazagaon Dock Limited, is one of India's largest shipyards. It constructs a variety of ships both for the defence and civilian sector. The dockyard is known for constructing Britain's . Currently the shipyard is building three s and three s for the Indian Navy.
 The beach at Alang in the Indian state of Gujarat is the site of a large complex of shipbreaking yards.  In 2010, the yard dismantled 357 ships; on average the yard processes 28–30 ships a month.
 The Jebel Ali and Dubai ports in the UAE are capable of handling, constructing and repairing large ships. They also provide dry dock facilities.
 The gate 7 of Shuwaikh port in the Kuwait has facility for repairing ships. They also provide dry dock facilities.
 Lavgan Dockyard Pvt. Ltd. India's newest ship repair facility (operational from June 2014).  Syncrolift and side transfer system.
 MOC Shipyards Private Limited, originating from Australia but relocated to Goa, India. Specialising in the construction of landing craft, work vessels and passenger transportation vessels, 100% export markets only and run under Australian Management and Ownership.
 Grandweld shipyard is a based in Dubai Maritime City, Dubai, UAE.  Grandweld builds a large variety of ships that include Crewboats, tugs, Offshore Supply Vessels (OSVs), pilot boats, fast ferries, and yacht support vessels (shadow yachts). Grandweld does drydockings and afloat repair for ships, with the synchrolift of Dubai Maritime City having a capacity of ships up to 130m or 6000t.

See also
 List of shipbuilders and shipyards
 Shipbuilding
 Shipyard transporter

References

External links 

 Shipbuilding History – extensive collection of information about North American shipyards, including over 500 pages of US shipyard construction records
 Shipyards United States – from GlobalSecurity.org

Yard
Coastal construction